H.R. 1 (short for House of Representatives 1) is an identifier for a bill of the United States House of Representatives. Historically, H.R. 1 indicated the first bill introduced in a given Congress (as the numbering system restarts every two years with each new Congress). However, since the start of the 106th Congress in 1999, each Congress's rules have called for reserving numbers 1 through 10 for assignment by the Speaker of the House. H.R. 1 is thus generally reserved for a major piece of legislation.

Notable examples

References